William Tisdall may refer to:
William Tisdale (–?), English renaissance composer
William Tisdall (priest) (1669–1735), Irish Anglican priest and controversialist
William St. Clair Tisdall (1859–1928), British historian and philologist